The  is a women's professional wrestling championship owned by the World Wonder Ring Stardom promotion. The title, which in Stardom's championship hierarchy is situated as the secondary title behind the World of Stardom Championship, was introduced on June 26, 2011, and the inaugural champion was crowned on July 24, 2011, when Yuzuki Aikawa defeated Yoshiko in a decision match.

Title history 

The title is often referred to simply as the "White Belt", a name famously used by All Japan Women's Pro-Wrestling (AJW) to refer to its All Pacific Championship. The title belt was crafted by American company Top Rope Belts based on designs sent by Stardom, with a conscious decision to imitate the AJW title belt in terms of its color, with Stardom president Rossy Ogawa referring to the promotion's heyday as the "Golden Age of Joshi Puroresu". The original title belt was awarded to undefeated inaugural champion Yuzuki Aikawa, when she retired from professional wrestling on April 29, 2013. It was replaced that same night by a second identical title belt.

Originally, only wrestlers officially signed to Stardom were eligible to challenge for the title, but this rule was abandoned in 2013, when Dark Angel and Yuhi were allowed to challenge for the title. Sarah Stock (wrestling under the name Dark Angel) became the first non-Japanese to win the title. When Santana Garrett won the title in November 2015, she started defending it in the United States, alongside the NWA World Women's Championship. Her six defenses on the American independent circuit were also recognized by Stardom.

Reigns 
Yuzuki Aikawa was the inaugural champion as well as the longest reign at 618 days. Yoko Bito has the shortest reign at 57 days. Act Yasukawa, Io Shirai and Mayu Iwatani has the most reigns at two. Io Shira had the most title defenses during her second reigns at 14 times. Dark Angel is the oldest champion at 34 years old, while Momo Watanabe is the youngest at 18 years old.

Saya Kamitani is the current champion in her first reign. She She defeated Tam Nakano on December 29, 2021 at Dream Queendom.

Combined reigns 

See also 
 World of Stardom Championship
 All Pacific Championship

References

External links 
 World Wonder Ring Stardom's official website
 Wonder of Stardom Championship history at Wrestling-Titles.com

World Wonder Ring Stardom championships
Women's professional wrestling championships